Isolo Public library is one of the 18 libraries established in Lagos State to encourage a reading culture in the residents of the state. It is under the Lagos State library board. Other libraries include Ikeja Secretariat library, Tolu Public library, Borno house library, and the Ipaja Public library.

History 
The library was established during the tenure of Brigadier-General Mohammed Buba Marwa's  administration who was the Lagos State Governor between the years 1996-1999.

Collections 
According to reports gathered in 2012 by the Guardian, there are about 168,812 books available for 177,573 readers and 138,721 are the volumes of books read in the libraries in Lagos altogether.

Renovation 
Changes were made to the library to introduce new facilities such as fans, chairs, tables and air conditioning in order to reduce heat and make it more conducive for use.

Structure 
Isolo Public library is large enough to contain about 120-150 people and according to the report from the Guardian's visit to the library, it opens at 8 am in the morning and closes in the evening around 4 pm.

See also 
 List of libraries in Nigeria
 Lagos State University of Science and technology

References

External links 
 Isolo Public library witnesses a face-lift

Public libraries in Nigeria